Ivan Dodig and Austin Krajicek defeated Máximo González and Marcelo Melo in the final, 6–3, 6–4 to win the doubles tennis title at the 2022 ATP Lyon Open.

Hugo Nys and Tim Pütz were the defending champions but only Nys chose to defend his title, partnering Jan Zieliński. Nys lost in the first round to González and Melo.

Seeds

Draw

Draw

References

External links
Main draw

ATP Lyon Open - Doubles
2022 Doubles